The International Association for Korean Language Education (IAKLE), founded in 1985, is the world's largest organization of Korean language educators, with over 1,200 members. Its first president was Fred Lukoff of the University of Washington.

References

External links
 Official site

Korean-language education